Rebecca Morris (born 1969 in Honolulu, Hawaii) is an abstract painter who is known for quirky, casualist compositions using grid-like structures. In 1994 she wrote Manifesto: For Abstractionists and Friends of the Non-Objective, a tongue-in-cheek but sincere response to contemporary criticism of abstract painting. She is currently a professor of painting and drawing at UCLA. Prior to that, she lectured at numerous colleges including Columbia University, Bard College, Pasadena City College, USC's School of Fine Arts, and the University of Chicago.

Early life and education
Morris was born in Honolulu, Hawaii and grew up in New Haven, Connecticut, which she says is a place that inspires some of her work. She received her BA from Smith College and her MFA from The School of the Art Institute of Chicago.

Work
Morris's artistic process may be characterized as casual, fluid and spontaneous. Inspired by craft and decoration, Morris explores the idiosyncrasy and imperfection of the artist’s hand. "I was always interested in creating systems and plan-type drawings." she said in a 2014 interview. "As a child, I drew floor plans of split-level houses, and plans for cities and towns. I also drew imaginary family trees, which were based on a grid-like system, but they featured cat families instead of people families." Morris avoids describing subject matter as she does not want to dictate what interpretations her painted forms may elicit. Some of her influences are the physical space of her studio, Raoul De Keyser, Joan Mitchell, James Meyer, and Terry Riley.  Some compositions are made working flat on the floor, and many include colors that suggest a kind of interior of overlapping paintings, objects, and arrangements of items on a wall. Her artistic practice has been likened to Laura Owens's free sense of historical reference, as well as Frank Stella and Richard Tuttle.

Awards
Morris is a recipient of a Guggenheim Fellowship and has also received awards from The City of Los Angeles, Tiffany Foundation, The Durfee Foundation, Art Matters, and the Illinois Arts Council.

Exhibitions
Morris has exhibited at 2014 Whitney Biennial (New York), The Renaissance Society at the University of Chicago, the Blaffer Art Museum at the University of Houston, Made in LA, Hammer Museum, The Kunstmuseum St. Gallen (Switzerland), Friedrich Petzel (New York), The Hessel Art Museum (New York), The Museum of Contemporary Art (Chicago), Santa Monica Museum of Art, and Night Gallery (Los Angeles). She has shown with Mary Boone and Bortolami in New York.

References

External links
 Artist's official website

American women painters
1969 births
Artists from Honolulu
Living people
Smith College alumni
Artists from Los Angeles
School of the Art Institute of Chicago alumni
21st-century American women artists
Casualist artists